The Women's 100 metre freestyle S9 event at the 2022 Commonwealth Games was held on 29 July at the Sandwell Aquatics Centre.

Schedule
The schedule is as follows:

All times are British Summer Time (UTC+1)

Results

Heats

Final

References

Women's 100 metre freestyle S9
Common